John Newbold Camp, known as Happy Camp (May 11, 1908 – September 27, 1987) was an American politician and a Republican U.S. Representative from Oklahoma.

Biography
Born in Enid, Camp was the son of Minnie C. Newbold and John R. Camp. Because of his pleasant personality as an infant, his father nicknamed him "Happy", and as an adult, the younger Camp legally changed his name so that the jovial word would appear on ballots as he ran for public office.  He attended elementary and high schools in Blackwell, Douglas, and Waukomis. He attended Phillips University in Enid. In November 1930 he married Vera Overman, and they had four children: Patricia, Kay, John III, and Steven Richard.

Career
Camp became president of Waukomis State Bank. He served as member of the State of Oklahoma House of Representatives from 1943 to 1963.
He served as chairman of the Oklahoma State Board of Public Affairs from 1967 to 1968. He was GOP precinct chairman of the Garfield County Young Republican chairman and Oklahoma committee member.

Elected as a Representative to the Ninety-First and to the two succeeding Congresses, Camp served from January 3, 1969 to January 3, 1975.  He was defeated for reelection in 1974, when the Watergate affair contributed to the defeat of dozens of Republican candidates across the country, even though those individuals were not involved in Watergate.

Death
Camp died from a heart attack in Enid, Garfield County, Oklahoma, on September 27, 1987 (age 79 years, 139 days). He is interred at Waukomis Cemetery, Waukomis, Oklahoma.

References

External links

 Encyclopedia of Oklahoma History and Culture - Camp, John
 John N. Happy Camp Collection and Photograph Collection at the Carl Albert Center
 

1908 births
1987 deaths
20th-century Members of the Oklahoma House of Representatives
Phillips University alumni
Politicians from Enid, Oklahoma
Republican Party members of the United States House of Representatives from Oklahoma
20th-century American politicians
Republican Party members of the Oklahoma House of Representatives